Lester Basil Sinclair (29 August 1894 – 5 October 1974) was one of the most prolific  Australian songwriters during World War II. At the same time, Sinclair was an important Australian children’s book author under the pen name John Mystery, publishing over 300 books. Sinclair was born in Yorkshire and emigrated to Australia as a teenager.

He built a turreted  ‘Adventure Castle’ on the tip of the Illawong Peninsula in Sydney where he wrote many of his children's books.  The mock castle no longer stands, but one of its ramparts serves as a castellated retaining wall on Cranbrook Place and several bas-relief sculptures remain in gardens on the same street.

Bibliography
Why Cows Moo, 28 pages. Lonsdale & Bartholomew, Sydney, 1936,. Black and white illustrations by Matt Herriot.

Further reading
Edward Duyker, "Sutherland: Towards a Literary Landscape", National Library of Australia News, vol. VI, no. 6, March 1996, pp. 14–18.

References

External links 

Australian children's writers
Australian male short story writers
1894 births
1974 deaths